The Ali bin Abi Talib Mosque is a mosque in Tobruk, Butnan District, Libya.

See also
 Islam in Libya
 List of mosques in Libya

Tobruk
Mosques in Libya